Aldrich Bailey Jr. (born February 6, 1994) is an American sprinter. He graduated from Mansfield Timberview High School in Arlington, Texas in 2012, and was committed to Texas A&M University in 2012. In 2014 Bailey transferred to the University of Texas as a Track and Field Athlete.

On April 28, 2012, Bailey broke the U.S. High School Record in the 400 metres, previously held by Calvin Harrison of North Salinas High School, at the Texas Class 5A Region I meet in Lubbock, Texas.  Harrison had held the record since 1993, a year before Bailey was born.

He was an All-USA high school track and field team selection by USA Today in 2011 and 2012.

Bailey was part of the US medley relay team that established a new World Youth Best at the 2011 World Youth Championships in Athletics. He also competed in the 200 metres, but finished sixth. He wears a duck tail at the back of his head as a signature style.

In 2021, Bailey began running the 400 meters hurdles. That season, he placed fourth at the U.S. Olympic Trials in a personal best time of 48.55 seconds, missing the Olympic team by one place. In its year-end U.S. rankings, Track & Field News ranked him fifth.

References

External links
 
 
 
 Aldrich Bailey Jr. at Texas Longhorns
 

1994 births
Living people
Sportspeople from Arlington, Texas
American male sprinters
Texas Longhorns men's track and field athletes
Track and field athletes from Texas
World Athletics Indoor Championships medalists